Christianity is the largest religion practiced in Zimbabwe, accounted for more than 84% of the population. The arrival of Christianity dates back to the 16th century by Portuguese missionaries such as Fr. Gonsalo Da Silveira of the Roman Catholic Church. Christianity is embraced by the majority of the population. It is estimated 85 percent of Zimbabweans claim to be Christians, with approximately 62 percent regularly attending church services. Christian faith plays a very important role in the organization of Zimbabwean society.

Heads of the Christian Denominations in Zimbabwe is an association made up of some of the common church bodies; Evangelical Fellowship of Zimbabwe, the Zimbabwe Catholic Bishops' Conference, and the Zimbabwe Council of Churches. However, recent years saw a large increase in the number of new denominations: notably "Apostles" or "Mapostori". Most of these denominations derive their teachings from the bible and attach greater emphasis on prophecy, demonstration of power, and fasting in the wilderness. Some reputable apostolic churches include Mugodhi, among others. Still, there are some "Apostles who disregard the Bible and believe in Messengers from God". There has been debate over the Western-formed churches including Anglican and Roman Catholic, over the truthfulness of the apostles' doctrine. While some apostles truly follow the Way of Christ, some violate bible principles through polygamy and false prophecy. In addition, there has been a growing number of Christian Ministries, including Prophetic Healing and Deliverance and United Family International Church, who are also criticized for overemphasizing the prosperity gospel and giving- while increasing the wealth of the leaders.

History
Roman Catholic missionaries were the first to arrive in Zimbabwe. The first attempt to introduce Christianity to the Shona [tribe of Zimbabwe] was made by a Portuguese Jesuit missionary, Gonçalo da Silveira, at the court of the Monomotapa dynasty until he was murdered as a result of court intrigues in 1561. Although at least a dozen Catholic churches were planted, they all disappeared by 1667, when Portugal's power was waning, leaving "no discernible trace of Christianity." This remained the situation until the movement of Protestant missions arrived in the nineteenth century.

In 1890 the 'Pioneer Column', Jesuit Catholic missionaries, and the Anglican Canon Belfour entered Lobengula's territory.

In 1799 Johannes Van der Kemp helped launch a missionary society called London Missionary Society (LMS). One of the LMS missionaries who helped launch Protestant missions into Zimbabwe was Robert Moffat and his wife Mary. One of Moffat's greatest accomplishments for missions in Zimbabwe was his friendship with Mzilikazi, king of the Ndebele tribe. Moffat's son-in-law David Livingstone had several expeditions in Zimbabwe around 1859. Another LMS missionary named Charles Daniel Helm founded the southern Rhodesia Missionary Conference. His sons Sam Helm and John Helm helped translate the New Testament of the Bible in the Karanga dialect of Shona, along with Andrew and Clini Louw of Dutch Reformed Mission Church. David Kingsley helped people understand the true meaning of churches. By 1918, they had finished the New Testament in four dialects: Ndau, Manyika, Zezuru, and Karanga. The Louws and some Sotho-speaking evangelists built various ministries in the region under Shona Reformed Church, but eventually they transferred all property to an indigenous church denomination called Reformed Church in Zimbabwe.

Indigenous religious movements
 Andries Mtshede (d.1929) was a nephew of King Lobengula, who became a policeman and court interpreter and later a Methodist minister.
 Johane Marange (1912-1963) was a Zimbabwean Christian leader, prophet, and founder of the Apostolic Church of John Marange.
 First Ethiopian Church of Zimbabwe (1910). The Church was founded in 1910 by Charichidembo and Edison Nheya Gavhure. The Church is headquartered at Rumedzo in Bikita Masvingo. It is one of the early break-away Churches by black indigenous Zimbabweans.

List of churches in Zimbabwe
Zimbabwe Assemblies of God Africa - ZAOGA Forward in Faith
Apostolic Faith Mission (AFM)
New Life Covenant Church - Jabula Ministries
Harvest House International (HHI)
United Church of Christ in Zimbabwe (UCCZ)
Celebration Ministries International
Faith Ministries
Catholic Church in Zimbabwe
Church of Central Africa Presbyterian – Harare Synod
Church of the Province of Central Africa part of the Anglican Communion
Coptic Orthodox Church
Eastern Orthodox Church
Methodist in Zimbabwe
Reformed Church In Zimbabwe - Dutch Reformed Church
Seventh-day Adventist
The Church of Jesus Christ of Latter-day Saints in Zimbabwe
United Methodist Church
Word Of Life Ministries
Apostles of God [Mupostori]
Covenant Life Ministries International
Christ Connect Family Church (CCFC) Funded by Bishop Farai Katsande, who became a believer through ZAOGA, and was raised in faith by a prominent evangelist Abel Sande, who was a core founder of ZAOGA, who later founded 
Ambassadors for Christ International
Pentecostal Assemblies of Zimbabwe
In His Presence Ministries
His Presence Ministries
First Ethiopian Church of Zimbabwe (FEC) - Founded in 1910 and led by Bishops Charichidembo (1910-1942) and Bishop Edson Nheya Gavhure (1943 - 1984). Bishop Ishmael Nheya Gavhure took over the leadership from 1985 till 2016. Currently the Church is led by Bishop Albert Gavhure since 2017.

See also
Christian Mysticism in Ancient Africa
Christianity by country
Religion in Zimbabwe

References

Further reading

External links